Following is a List of senators of Guadeloupe, people who have represented the department of Guadeloupe in the Senate of France.

Third Republic

Fourth Republic 
The Fourth Republic lasted from 1946 to 1958.

Fifth Republic

References

 
Guadeloupe
Senators